Pereute callinira is a butterfly of the family Pieridae.

Description
The basic colour of the wings is black or dark brown. The uppersides of the forewings are crossed by a red band, while the basal area of the hindwings is blue. The undersides of the wings are uniformly blackish. Larvae feed on Nectandra species (Lauraceae).

Distribution
This species can be found in Peru, Colombia, Bolivia and Ecuador.

Subspecies
Pereute callinira callinira (Peru, Colombia, Bolivia, Ecuador) 
Pereute callinira sabrina Fruhstorfer, 1907 (Colombia)

References

Pierini
Taxa named by Otto Staudinger
Butterflies described in 1884
Pieridae of South America